The 2020 Northern Ireland Open (also known as the Matchroom.Live Northern Ireland Open) was a professional ranking snooker tournament that took place from 16 to 22 November 2020 at the Marshall Arena in Milton Keynes, England. It was the fourth ranking event of the 2020–21 season and a part of the Home Nations Series. It was the fifth edition of the Northern Ireland Open.

For the third consecutive edition of the tournament, Judd Trump defeated Ronnie O'Sullivan 9–7 in final, winning his 19th ranking title. He is the first player to win a ranking event three times in a row since Stephen Hendry won the UK Championship from 1994 to 1996. He is also the first to win four Home Nations Series titles, and the second, after Mark Selby, to win two Home Nations events in a single season. During this tournament, he made the fifth maximum break of his career in the third frame of his second-round match with Gao Yang.

Prize fund
The breakdown of prize money for this year is shown below:

 Winner: £70,000
 Runner-up: £30,000
 Semi-final: £20,000
 Quarter-final: £10,000
 Last 16: £7,500
 Last 32: £4,000
 Last 64: £3,000
 Highest break: £5,000
 Total: £405,000

Main draw

Top half

Section 1

Section 2

Section 3

Section 4

Bottom half

Section 5

Section 6

Section 7

Section 8

Finals

Final

Century breaks
A total of 68 century breaks were made during the competition.

147, 128, 127, 115, 112, 109, 105, 103, 101  Judd Trump
144, 130  John Higgins
142  Anthony McGill
141  Ashley Carty
137, 125, 103  Yan Bingtao
135, 135, 127, 112  Kurt Maflin
135  Kyren Wilson
134, 130, 118, 101  Ben Woollaston
134, 109, 109, 100  Zhao Xintong
133  Luca Brecel
133  Chang Bingyu
133  Mark Williams
130, 125, 111  Mark Allen
130, 125, 106, 103, 102, 100  Ronnie O'Sullivan
130  Stuart Bingham
127, 116  Patrick Wallace
122  Lee Walker
121, 107, 100  Ding Junhui
121, 106  Liang Wenbo
117, 101  Martin Gould
114  Lu Ning
113, 107  Ryan Day
109  Andy Hicks
108, 103, 101, 100  Ali Carter
104  David Grace
104  Barry Hawkins
104  Robert Milkins
103  Stephen Maguire
102  Alex Borg
102  Liam Highfield
101, 101  Ken Doherty

References

Home Nations Series
2020
Northern Ireland Open
November 2020 sports events in the United Kingdom
Sport in Milton Keynes
Snooker competitions in England